The Streetbank is a UK-based network and Website that helps users share items with their neighbours which was launched in July 2010 by Sam Stephens and Ryan Davies in West London. Sam Stephens initially set it up to encourage neighbors to share items that they own but do not use every day, such as ladders, drills, and hedge cutters, as well as to "save money, cut down on waste, and reduce their carbon footprints". The purpose of Streetbank is to boost local communities by encouraging people to get to know their neighbours. Streetbank also allows its users to share advice, skills, language teaching, cooking, and DIY.

The website has 60,000 members worldwide. It had 15,000 members in September 2012. More than £1 million worth of skills and items had been listed on the site by October 2013. The organization has 300 members per square mile in West London, its busiest area. 
In 2013, The Times listed the site as one of the "50 websites you can’t live without".

Accounts are free to set up. Once the account is set up the user will receive emails from other users living nearby. Users can offer items for free or to lend, or offer skills. Members can also make requests and provide information ("notices"). User can choose the size of their "neighbourhood" and can opt to receive messages from other users living within one, five or ten miles. After a user joins Streetbank, they receive a weekly newsletter about local announcements and new offers and wants.

History 
The Streetbank was founded in 2010, as a not for profit organization. Founder Sam Stephens says he got the idea when he saw a neighbour using a pair of hedge cutters and realised he needed to borrow some.

In 2012 and 2013, Streetbank was awarded funding by Nesta.

In October 2013, Streetbank 2.0 was launched.

In 2014, Streetbank merged with Freeconomy, a similar organisation set up by Mark Boyle (the moneyless man). Mark continued as part of the Streetbank leadership team.

Press articles
 Aljazeera "Local Hero: Sam Stephens ... founded Streetbank website with Ryan Davies in 2010, a "people's bank" for more sustainable existence".
 The Huffington Post "Putting the 'Social' Back into Social Networks..."
 Daily Candy "Borrow from, Lend to and Share with Your Neighbours"
 London Evening Standard "Local website for neighbours who like to give and share"
 The Big Issue "Streetbank shows that everyone can have good neighbours"
 The Guardian "Students: where to find free stuff"

References

External links
 

Neighborhood associations
Sharing economy